Djibo is a common masculine name in Muslim countries, and is a diminutive form of Djibril (alternatively Djibrilla, Jibrīl, Jibrīlla, Jibril, Jibreel or Jabrilæ (جبريل, جبرائيل, or ), the Arabic name for Gabriel.  In English the equivalent name is Gabe.

Notable people named Djibo
 Djibo Bakary was a socialist politician and important figure in the independence movement of Niger.
 Djibo Leyti Kâ is a Senegalese politician and the Secretary-General of the Union for Democratic Renewal (URD).

As a surname
Martine Djibo, Ivorian educator and politician